Villa Cornaro is a patrician villa in Piombino Dese, about 30 km northwest of Venice, Italy. It was designed by the Italian Renaissance architect Andrea Palladio in 1552 and is illustrated and described by him in Book Two of his 1570 masterwork, I quattro libri dell'architettura (The Four Books on Architecture).

Architecture

Villa Cornaro was mainly constructed in 1553–1554, with additional work into the 1590s, after Palladio had died, for Giorgio Cornaro, younger son of a wealthy family. It represents one of the most exemplary illustrations of a Renaissance villa during this time frame. The north façade has an innovative projecting central portico-loggia that is a flexible living space out of the sun and open to cooling breezes. The interior space is a harmonious arrangement of the strictly symmetrical floor plans on which Palladio insisted without exception. Rooms of inter-related proportions composed of squares and rectangles flank a central axial vista, which extends through the house. As Rudolf Wittkower noted, by moving subsidiary staircases into the projecting wings and filling matching corner spaces with paired oval principal stairs, space was left for a central salone, which is fully as wide as the porticos. The central core of the villa forms a rectangle in which there are six repetitions of an elegant standard module. The interior has 18th-century frescos by Mattia Bortoloni and stuccos by Camillo Mariani.

Influence
Through its illustration in Palladio's I quattro libri dell'architettura, in the 18th century Villa Cornaro became a model for villas all over the world, particularly in England Marble Hill House (1724–29) in Twickenham, Middlesex, and in colonial America Drayton Hall (1738–1742) in Charleston, South Carolina, and Thomas Jefferson's  initial version of Monticello (1768–1770) are early examples of its influence.

Conservation

Richard Rush purchased the Villa Cornaro in 1969 from an organization of the Italian Government dedicated to preserving the national monuments of Italy in the Veneto (L'Ente per le Ville Venete).  He and his wife, Julia, restored the villa and furnished it with antiques over a period of twenty years. Since 1996 the villa has been conserved as part of a World Heritage Site "City of Vicenza and the Palladian Villas of the Veneto".

The villa is owned by Carl and Sally Gable, of Atlanta, Georgia, who purchased it in 1989 for $2 million from Dr. Rush. In 2017, the couple put up the villa for sale; the asking price was 35 million British pounds.

Gallery

See also

 Palladian architecture
 Palladian Villas of the Veneto

Notes

External links
"Palladio and the Veneto" a catalogue of the villas maintained by www.cisapalladio.org. 
Palladio's Italian Villas (Villa Cornaro-Gable)
"The Secrets of Palladio's Villas", Carl I. Gable
Center for Palladian Studies in America, Inc.

Houses completed in 1554
Renaissance architecture in Veneto
Cornaro
Andrea Palladio buildings
Palladian villas of Veneto
1554 establishments in the Republic of Venice